Cerreto di Spoleto is an Italian village and comune of the province of Perugia in Umbria. It is a  dispersed rural community with 1,158 inhabitants spread over 8 frazioni. Its claim to fame is to be the root of the English term "charlatan", as Cerreto was once widely known for the quacks among its natives.

Villages

Ponte di Cerreto is a village of about 200 inhabitants about a mile south of Cerreto.  Though now insignificant, Ponte was once an important defensive outpost overlooking the first bridge over the Nera River. The counts of Celano built a fortress at this site, which has not survived. Today, the village is best known for the 12th-century Romanesque abbey church of Santa Maria: the façade includes a very good rose window, and the interior is notable for preserving the architect's sketch of that window, engraved on one of the walls of the nave. Among the frescoes is an almost equally rare depiction of the Trinity as a three-headed man.

Its principal sights are three churches, two of them medieval and the third of the 16th‑18th centuries, of which the best is San Nicola, with a frescoed interior.

Additional frazioni
 Colle Soglio
 Nortosce

Notable people
The Renaissance humanist and poet Iovianus Pontanus (Giovanni Gioviano Pontano) was born here in 1426—although after his father had been murdered in a civic brawl his mother escaped with the boy to Perugia.

See also
Rocchetta

References

External links
Official website
Thayer's Gazetteer of Umbria - Cerreto
Thayer's Gazetteer of Umbria - Ponte
Bill Thayer's Gazetteer - Rocchetta

Cities and towns in Umbria
Romanesque architecture in Umbria